Brian Kelly (born 22 January 1990) is an Irish sportsperson. He plays Gaelic football with his local club Killarney Legion and has been a member of the Kerry senior inter-county team since 2012.

Schools
Kelly played with St Brendan's College, Killarney with whom he won a Munster Colleges Corn Uí Mhuirí title in 2008. The school later qualified for the Hogan Cup final nut lost out to St Patrick's Academy, Dungannon in Croke Park.

College
Kelly later attended University College Cork. He lined out with the UCC GAA club and won a Sigerson Cup title in 2014.

References

1990 births
Living people
Gaelic football goalkeepers
Kerry inter-county Gaelic footballers
Killarney Legion Gaelic footballers